The Waverly Wind Farm is a wind powered electricity generation project in Kansas owned and operated by EDP Renewables. This site is located near Waverly, in Coffey County. The wind farm consists of 95 wind turbines over 25 square miles, generating up to 199 MW.

It consists of 90 Siemens Gamesa 2.1MW and 5 Gamesa 2MW turbines.

See also
List of wind farms in the United States

References

External links
 
  Wind energy booming in Kansas
 Waverly Wind Farm celebrates fifth birthday as Energy Efficiency Day winds down

Wind farms in Kansas
Energy infrastructure completed in 2016
Buildings and structures in Coffey County, Kansas